Siegfried & Roy: Masters of the Impossible was a short-lived 1996 animated television series based on the Las Vegas magician act Siegfried & Roy. The performers, famous for their animal acts with white tigers and lions, were recast as action-adventure heroes in the mythical land of Sarmoti.

Plot
Siegfried is an illusionist and Roy is an animal tamer traveling with a white tiger named Manticore. They meet in a kingdom where four demons have recently been released, three of them are personifications of sins and tempt members of the royal court to give in to their vices while the fourth is actually part of Manticore. Roy wishes to make Manticore whole and works with Siegfried to this end while they also try to save the kingdom from the other three demons, which they accomplish using their own brand of magic.

Cast
 Jim Cummings
 Tony Jay
 Charlie Adler
 Jeff Bennett

References

External links
 

1996 American television series debuts
1996 American television series endings
1990s American animated television series
American children's animated action television series
American children's animated adventure television series
Television about magic
Television series by DIC Entertainment
Animation based on real people
Fox Kids